Michele Avella (born 1 May 2000) is an Italian professional footballer who plays as a goalkeeper for  club Virtus Francavilla.

Club career 
Born in Naples, Avella started his career in Casertana youth system.

On 29 July 2019, he was loaned to Serie D club ACR Messina.

On 11 August 2021, he joined Ancona-Matelica.

On 23 June 2022, Avella agreed to a move to Virtus Francavilla.

References

External links
 
 
 

2000 births
Living people
Footballers from Naples
Italian footballers
Association football goalkeepers
Serie C players
Serie D players
Casertana F.C. players
S.S. Matelica Calcio 1921 players
A.C.R. Messina players
Ancona-Matelica players
Virtus Francavilla Calcio players